Action Construction Equipment Ltd. is an Indian material handling and construction equipment manufacturing company, incorporated in 1995.

The company has eight manufacturing sites in Faridabad, Haryana, with a research and development in Faridabad district, and has a manufacturing capacity of 12000 construction equipment and 9000 tractors annually. Their product portfolio is divided into four main categories: agricultural equipment, construction equipment, road construction equipment, and earth-moving machinery, mainly catering to Asia-Pacific, Africa and Latin America regions.

In 2019, the company was ranked at #223 in Fortune magazine's "Next 500" list of midsized Indian companies.

Timeline
1995 – company incorporated, rolled out its first hydraulic mobile crane
1997 – received ISO 9001:2008 certification; established regional office in Mumbai
1998 – rolled out first mobile tower crane
1999 – rolled out its first small Loader; exported its first machine
2001 – partnership with Autogru PM, Italy for distribution of their products.
2004 – sold first tower crane and began developing fixed tower cranes
2006 – formed joint venture with Italian firm Tigieffe; listing on Stock Exchange – BSE and NSE; CNBC TV 18 emerging company award
2007  – launched forklift truck; became first Indian construction equipment manufacturer to be accorded CE marking; approved acquisition of a Romanian company by its Cyprus-based subsidiary, Frested Ltd.
2008 – partnered with Chinese manufacturer Zoomlion; launched crawler cranes; rolled out the tractor range
2009 – designed, developed and launched road making equipment
2010 – Indigenous production of big Tower Cranes.
2011 – launch of in-house R&D center; in-house manufacturing of crawler cranes
2012 – launched new generation pick and carry cranes, lorry loaders, and higher-capacity tower cranes
2013 – started in-house engine plant; launched Free of Cost 24 x 7 ambulance service for the areas of Palwal and Faridabad Districts.
2014 – launched wheel harvester
2015 – launched rotavator and other agricultural implements
2016 – launched skid-steer loader and partnered with Turkish company Boom Makina
2017 – launched tractor range of up to 90 HP
2018 – launched AX124 backhoe loader for export market; ACE entered into MoU with Ursus SA for localization new range of tractors.; partnered with Punjab National Bank for farm machinery financing.
2019 – launched NX-series Multi Activity Crane at Bauma Conexpo, India Launched NX360° slew-cum-pick and carry crane from Tara Chand Logistics, Mumbai

Awards and recognition

 ICICI, CNBC-TV18 Emerging India Awards 2005-2006
 India's Best Company of the Year Award 2018 by Berkshire Media Pvt. Ltd. (A Division of Berkshire Media LLC, USA)
 Dream Companies to Work for - Construction Sector, 16 February 2019
 Award for Brand Excellence- Construction Equipment Industry ACE-  National Brand Leadership Congress & Awards 2019
 Best Training Initiative Award (Infrastructure Sector) in National Award For Excellence in Training & Development 2019
 North India Best Employer Brand Award - 13th Employer Branding Awards 2018
 India's Top Challengers Award - 16th Construction World Global Awards-2018
 Best Seller in Mobile Cranes Category Award - 6th Equipment India-2018
 Best Seller in Mobile Cranes Category Award-5th Equipment India-2018
 Associate Partner in India's Top Challengers Award-Construction World-2017
 India's Most Trusted Company Award-IBC, USA-2017
 "70 Most Trusted Power Brands of India" Award-2017
 Economic Times "Infra Focus" Award-2017.
 Best Seller in Mobile Cranes Category Award-4th Equipment India-2017
 Construction World-2006, 2007, 2008, 2011, and 2012

References 

Indian companies established in 1995
Construction equipment manufacturers of India
Companies based in Haryana
Indian brands
1995 establishments in Haryana
Companies listed on the National Stock Exchange of India
Companies listed on the Bombay Stock Exchange